"Wilhelmus van Nassouwe", usually known just as "Wilhelmus" (English translation: "The William"), is the national anthem of both the Netherlands and the Kingdom of the Netherlands. It dates back to at least 1572, making it the oldest national anthem in use today, provided that the latter is defined as consisting of both a melody and lyrics. Although "Wilhelmus" was not recognized as the official national anthem until 1932, it has always been popular with parts of the Dutch population and resurfaced on several occasions in the course of Dutch history before gaining its present status. It was also the anthem of the Netherlands Antilles from 1954 to 1964.

"Wilhelmus" originated in the Dutch Revolt, the nation's struggle to achieve independence from the Spanish Empire. It tells of the Father of the Nation William of Orange who was stadholder in the Netherlands under the King of Spain. In the first person, as if quoting himself, William speaks to the Dutch about both the revolt and his own, personal struggle: to be faithful to the king, without being unfaithful to his conscience: to serve God and the Dutch. In the lyrics William compares himself with the biblical David who serves under the tyrannic king Saul. As the merciful David defeats the unjust Saul and is rewarded by God with the kingdom of Israel, so too William hopes to be rewarded with a kingdom. Both "Wilhelmus" and the Dutch Revolt should be seen in the light of the 16th century Reformation in Europe
and the resulting persecution of Protestants by the Spanish Inquisition in the Low Countries. Militant music proved very useful not only in lampooning Roman clerks and repressive monarchs but also in generating class-transcending social cohesion. In successfully combining a psalmic character with political relevancy, "Wilhelmus" stands as the pre-eminent example of the genre.

Inception

Origins of melody 
The melody of "Wilhelmus" was borrowed from a well-known Roman Catholic French song titled "Autre chanson de la ville de Chartres assiégée par le prince de Condé", or in short: "Chartres". This song ridiculed the failed Siege of Chartres in 1568 by the Huguenot (Protestant) Prince de Condé during the French Wars of Religion. However, the triumphant contents of "Wilhelmus" differ greatly from the content of the original song, making it subversive at several levels. Thus, the Dutch Protestants had taken over an anti-Protestant song, and adapted it into propaganda for their own agenda. In that way, "Wilhelmus" was typical for its time: it was common practice in the 16th century for warring groups to steal each other's songs in order to rewrite them.

Even though the melody stems from 1568, the first known written down version of it comes from 1574; at the time the anthem was sung at a much quicker pace. Dutch composer Adriaen Valerius recorded the current melody of "Wilhelmus" in his Nederlantsche Gedenck-clanck in 1626, slowing down the melody's pace, probably to allow it to be sung in churches.

Origins of lyrics 
The origins of the lyrics are uncertain. "Wilhelmus" was first written some time between the start of the Eighty Years' War in April 1568 and the capture of Brielle on 1 April 1572. Soon after the anthem was finished it was said that either Philips of Marnix, a writer, statesman and former mayor of Antwerp, or Dirck Coornhert, a politician and theologian, wrote the lyrics. However, this is disputed as neither Marnix nor Coornhert ever mentioned that they had written the lyrics, even though the song was immensely popular in their time. "Wilhelmus" also has some odd rhymes in it. In some cases the vowels of certain words were altered to allow them to rhyme with other words. Some see this as evidence that neither Marnix or Coornhert wrote the anthem, as they were both experienced poets when "Wilhelmus" was written, and it is said they would not have taken these small liberties. Hence some believe that the lyrics of the Dutch national anthem were the creation of someone who just wrote one poem for the occasion and then disappeared from history. A French translation of "Wilhelmus" appeared around 1582.

Recent stylometric research has mentioned Pieter Datheen as a possible author of the text of the Dutch national anthem. Dutch and Flemish researchers (Meertens Institute, Utrecht University and University of Antwerp) discovered by chance a striking number of similarities between his style and the style of the national anthem.

Structure and interpretation 

The complete text comprises fifteen stanzas. The anthem is an acrostic: the first letters of the fifteen stanzas formed the name "Willem van Nassov" (Nassov was a contemporary orthographic variant of Nassau). In the current Dutch spelling the first words of the 12th and 13th stanzas begin with Z instead of S.

Like many of the songs of the period, it has a complex structure, composed around a thematic chiasmus: the text is symmetrical, in that verses one and 15 resemble one another in meaning, as do verses two and 14, three and 13, etc., until they converge in the 8th verse, the heart of the song: "Oh David, thou soughtest shelter from King Saul's tyranny. Even so I fled this welter", where the comparison is made not only between the biblical David and William of Orange as a merciful and just leader of the Dutch Revolt, but also between the tyrant King Saul and the Spanish crown, and between the promised land of Israel granted by God to David, and a kingdom granted by God to William.

In the first person, as if quoting himself, William speaks about how his disagreement with his king troubles him; he tries to be faithful to his king, but he is above all faithful to his conscience: to serve God and the Dutch people. Therefore, the last two lines of the first stanza indicate that the leader of the Dutch civil war against the Spanish Empire, of which they were part, had no specific quarrel with king Philip II of Spain, but rather with his emissaries in the Low Countries, such as Fernando Álvarez de Toledo, 3rd Duke of Alba. This may have been because at the time (late 16th century) it was uncommon to doubt publicly the divine right of kings, who were accountable to God alone. In 1581 the Netherlands nevertheless rejected the legitimacy of the king of Spain's rule over it in the Act of Abjuration.

"Duytschen" (in English generally translated as "Dutch", "native" or Germanic) in the first stanza is a reference to William's roots; its modern Dutch equivalent, "Duits", exclusively means "German", and it may refer to William's ancestral house (Nassau, Germany) or to the lands of the Holy Roman Empire, including the Netherlands. But most probably it is simply a reference to the broader meaning of the word, which points out William as a "native" of the fatherland, as opposed to the king of Spain, who seldom or never visited the Netherlands. The prince thus states that his roots are Germanic rather than Romance – in spite of his being Prince of Orange as well.

Performance

History 

Though only proclaimed the national anthem in 1932, the "Wilhelmus" already had a centuries-old history. It had been sung on many official occasions and at many important events since the outbreak of the Dutch Revolt in 1568, such as the siege of Haarlem in 1573 and the ceremonial entry of the Prince of Orange into Brussels on 18 September 1578.

It has been claimed that during the gruesome torture of Balthasar Gérard (the assassin of William of Orange) in 1584, the song was sung by the guards who sought to overpower Gérard's screams when boiling pigs' fat was poured over him. Gérard allegedly responded "Sing! Dutch sinners! Sing! But know that soon I shall be sung of!".

Another legend claims that following the Navigation Act 1651 (an ordinance by Oliver Cromwell requiring all foreign fleets in the North Sea or the Channel to dip their flag in salute) the "Wilhelmus" was sung (or rather, shouted) by the sailors on the Dutch flagship Brederode in response to the first warning shot fired by an English fleet under Robert Blake, when their captain Maarten Tromp refused to lower his flag. At the end of the song, which coincided with the third and last English warning shot, Tromp fired a full broadside, thereby beginning the Battle of Goodwin Sands and the First Anglo-Dutch War.

During the Dutch Golden Age, it was conceived essentially as the anthem of the House of Orange-Nassau and its supporters – which meant, in the politics of the time, the anthem of a specific political faction which was involved in a prolonged struggle with opposing factions (which sometimes became violent, verging on civil war). Therefore, the fortunes of the song paralleled those of the Orangist faction. Trumpets played the "Wilhelmus" when Prince Maurits visited Breda, and again when he was received in state in Amsterdam in May 1618. When William V arrived in Schoonhoven in 1787, after the authority of the stadholders had been restored, the church bells are said to have played the "Wilhelmus" continuously. After the Batavian Revolution, inspired by the French Revolution, it had come to be called the "Princes' March" as it was banned during the rule of the Patriots, who did not support the House of Orange-Nassau.

However, at the foundation of the Kingdom of the Netherlands in 1813, the "Wilhelmus" had fallen out of favour. Having become monarchs with a claim to represent the entire nation and stand above factions, the House of Orange decided to break with the song which served them as heads of a faction, and the "Wilhelmus" was replaced by Hendrik Tollens' song Wien Neêrlands bloed door d'aderen vloeit, which was the official Dutch anthem from 1815 until 1932. However, the "Wilhelmus" remained popular and lost its identification as a factional song, and on 10 May 1932, it was decreed that on all official occasions requiring the performance of the national anthem, the "Wilhelmus" was to be played – thereby replacing Tollens' song.

Wilhelmus had a Malay translation of which was sung back when Indonesia was under Dutch colonial rule.

During the German occupation of the Netherlands, Arthur Seyss-Inquart, the Nazi Reichskommissar, banned all the emblems of the Dutch royal family, including the "Wilhelmus". It was then taken up by all factions of the Dutch resistance, even those socialists who had previously taken an anti-monarchist stance. The pro-German Nationaal-Socialistische Beweging (NSB), who had sung the "Wilhelmus" at their meetings before the occupation, replaced it with Alle Man van Neerlands Stam ("All Men of Dutch Origin"). The anthem was drawn to the attention of the English-speaking world by the 1942 British war film, One of Our Aircraft Is Missing. The film concerns a Royal Air Force bomber crew who are shot down over the occupied Netherlands and are helped to escape by the local inhabitants. The melody is heard during the film as part of the campaign of passive resistance by the population, and it finishes with the coat of arms of the Netherlands on screen while the "Wilhelmus" is played.

Current 

The "Wilhelmus" is to be played only once at a ceremony or other event and, if possible, it is to be the last piece of music to be played when receiving a foreign head of state or emissary.

During international sport events, such as the World Cup, UEFA European Football Championship, the Olympic Games and the Dutch Grand Prix, the "Wilhelmus" is also played. In nearly every case the 1st and 6th stanzas (or repeating the last lines), or the 1st stanza alone, are sung/played rather than the entire song, which would result in about 15 minutes of music.

The "Wilhelmus" is also widely used in Flemish nationalist gatherings as a symbol of cultural unity with the Netherlands. Yearly rallies like the "IJzerbedevaart" and the "Vlaams Nationaal Zangfeest" close with singing the 6th stanza, after which the Flemish national anthem "De Vlaamse Leeuw" is sung.

Variations
An important set of variations on the melody of "Wilhelmus van Nassouwe" is that by the blind carillon-player Jacob van Eyck in his mid-17th century collection of variations Der Fluyten Lust-hof.

The 10-year old Wolfgang Amadeus Mozart composed in 1766, while visiting Holland, a set of 7 variations for keyboard in D major on the song, now listed as K. 25.

Richard Strauss wrote his "Variationen über 'Wilhelm von Oraniên'" for military band in 1892. The manuscript which, it seems, was mislaid, is in the Koninklijke Collecties in the Hague. There is a recording available on YouTube by the Band of the Netherlands Royal Marines.

The royal anthem of Luxembourg (called "De Wilhelmus") is a variation on the Wilhelmus. The melody was first used in Luxembourg (at the time in personal union with the Kingdom of the United Netherlands) on the occasion of the visit of the Dutch King and Grand Duke of Luxembourg William III in 1883. Later, the anthem was played for Grand Duke Adolph of Luxembourg along with the national anthem. The melody is very similar, but not identical to that of the "Wilhelmus". It is in official use since 1919.

The song "Wenn alle untreu werden" (German: "If everyone becomes unfaithful") better known as "Das Treuelied", which was written by the poet Max von Schenkendorf (1783–1817) used exactly the same melody as the "Wilhelmus". After the First World War this became extremely popular among German nationalist groups. It became one of the most popular songs of the SS, together with the Horst Wessel song.

The melody is also used in the Swedish folksong "" ("Alas, Gothic kingdom"), written down in 1626. The song deals with the liberation struggle of Sweden under Gustav Vasa in the 16th century.

Lyrics

It used the following text as an introduction to the "Wilhelmus":'
{| class="wikitable"
|
|A new Christian song made in the honour of the most noble lord, lord William Prince of Orange, count of Nassau, Pater Patriae (Father of the Nation), my merciful prince and lord. [A song] of which the first capital letter of each stanza form the name of his merciful prince. To the melody of Chartres.
|}

Original Dutch (1568)

Acrostic
Contemporary Dutch
Official free translation

William of Nassau, scion
Of a Dutch and ancient line,
I dedicate undying
Faith to this land of mine.
A prince I am, undaunted,
Of Orange, ever free,
To the king of Spain I've granted
A lifelong loyalty.

I've ever tried to live in
The fear of God's command
And therefore I've been driven,
From people, home, and land,
But God, I trust, will rate me
His willing instrument
And one day reinstate me
Into my government.

Let no despair betray you,
My subjects true and good.
The Lord will surely stay you
Though now you are pursued.
He who would live devoutly
Must pray God day and night
To throw His power about me
As champion of your right.

Life and my all for others
I sacrificed, for you!
And my illustrious brothers
Proved their devotion too.
Count Adolf, more's the pity,
Fell in the Frisian fray,
And in the eternal city
Awaits the judgement day.

I, nobly born, descended
From an imperial stock.
An empire's prince, defended
(Braving the battle's shock
Heroically and fearless
As pious Christian ought)
With my life's blood the peerless
Gospel of God our Lord.

A shield and my reliance,
O God, Thou ever wert.
I'll trust unto Thy guidance.
O leave me not ungirt.
That I may stay a pious
Servant of Thine for aye
And drive the plagues that try us
And tyranny away.

My God, I pray thee, save me
From all who do pursue
And threaten to enslave me,
Thy trusted servant true.
O Father, do not sanction
Their wicked, foul design,
Don't let them wash their hands in
This guiltless blood of mine.

O David, thou soughtest shelter
From King Saul's tyranny.
Even so I fled this welter
And many a lord with me.
But God the Lord did save me
From exile and its hell
And, in His mercy, gave him
A realm in Israel.

Fear not 't will rain sans ceasing
The clouds are bound to part.
I bide that sight so pleasing
Unto my princely heart,
Which is that I with honor
Encounter death in war,
And meet in heaven my Donor,
His faithful warrior.

Nothing so moves my pity
As seeing through these lands,
Field, village, town and city
Pillaged by roving hands.
O that the Spaniards rape thee,
My Netherlands so sweet,
The thought of that does grip me
Causing my heart to bleed.

A stride on steed of mettle
I've waited with my host
The tyrant's call to battle,
Who durst not do his boast.
For, near Maastricht ensconced,
He feared the force I wield.
My horsemen saw one bounce it
Bravely across the field.

Surely, if God had willed it,
When that fierce tempest blew,
My power would have stilled it,
Or turned its blast from you
But He who dwells in heaven,
Whence all our blessings flow,
For which aye praise be given,
Did not desire it so.

Steadfast my heart remaineth
In my adversity
My princely courage straineth
All nerves to live and be.
I've prayed the Lord my Master
With fervid heart and tense
To save me from disaster
And prove my innocence.

Alas! my flock. To sever
Is hard on us. Farewell.
Your Shepherd wakes, wherever
Dispersed you may dwell,
Pray God that He may ease you.
His Gospel be your cure.
Walk in the steps of Jesu
This life will not endure.

Unto the Lord His power
I do confession make
That ne'er at any hour
Ill of the King I spake.
But unto God, the greatest
Of Majesties I owe
Obedience first and latest,
For Justice wills it so.

 
WILLIAM OF NASSAU

IPA transcription of the first and sixth stanzas

Notes

References

External links

 
 Sheet music of "Wilhelmus"
 "Wilhelmus", vocal version of the first and sixth verse at the Himnuszok website 
 A song for Prince William authentic version on youtube
 Strauss: "Variationen über 'Wilhelm von Oraniên'" for military band

National anthems
Eighty Years' War (1566–1609)
Dutch anthems
Cultural depictions of William the Silent
Songs about politicians
Songs about military officers
National anthem compositions in A major
National anthem compositions in G major
Royal anthems